The 2022 Citrus Bowl was a college football bowl game played on January 1, 2022, with kickoff at 1:00 p.m. EST and televised on ABC. It was the 76th edition of the Citrus Bowl, and was one of the 2021–22 bowl games concluding the 2021 FBS football season. Sponsored by Vrbo, a vacation rental marketplace owned by the HomeAway division of Expedia, the game was officially known as the Vrbo Citrus Bowl.

Teams
In the first meeting between the two programs, the game featured the Kentucky Wildcats of the Southeastern Conference (SEC) and the Iowa Hawkeyes of the Big Ten Conference. Both teams received and accepted invitations on Sunday, December 5.

Kentucky Wildcats

The Wildcats entered the Citrus Bowl with a 9–3 record (5–3 SEC) and a No. 22 ranking in the final CFP poll. Kentucky made its second Citrus Bowl appearance (2019).

Iowa Hawkeyes

The Hawkeyes, winners of the Big Ten West Division, entered the Citrus Bowl with a 10–3 record (7–2 B1G) and a No. 15 ranking in the final CFP poll. Iowa also made its second Citrus Bowl appearance (2005).

Game summary

Statistics

See also
2021 Cheez-It Bowl, contested at the same venue three days prior

References

External links
 Game statistics at statbroadcast.com

Citrus Bowl
Citrus Bowl (game)
Iowa Hawkeyes football bowl games
Kentucky Wildcats football bowl games
Citrus Bowl
Citrus Bowl